Mira Municipality may refer to:
Mira Municipality, Portugal
Mira, Spain, a municipality in Cuenca Province